is a railway station in Tagawa, Fukuoka, Japan, operated by Kyushu Railway Company (JR Kyushu) and Heisei Chikuho Railway.

Lines
Tagawa-Gotōji Station is served by the Hitahikosan Line, Gotōji Line and Heisei Chikuho Railway Itoda Line.

Adjacent stations

See also
 List of railway stations in Japan

References

External links

  

Railway stations in Japan opened in 1896
Railway stations in Fukuoka Prefecture
Tagawa, Fukuoka